Beate Finckh (born 22 April 1960) is a German actress.

Selected filmography
 Desperado City (1980), as Liane
 Die Knapp-Familie (1981–1983, TV series), as Elisabeth Knapp
 Der Tod in der Waschstraße (1982), as Jutta
  (1984), as Mira
 Parker (1984), as Sister
 Kaminsky (1985), as Renate Schuler
 Of Pure Blood (1986), as Marta
 Wahnfried (1986), as Elisabeth Nietzsche
 Jokehnen (1987, TV miniseries), as Ilse Aschmoneit

External links

ZBF Agency Hamburg 

German film actresses
German television actresses
Actresses from Berlin
1960 births
Living people
20th-century German actresses
21st-century German actresses